James Hadley Stewart (13 August 1889 – 12 December 1964) was an Australian rules footballer who played with South Melbourne in the Victorian Football League (VFL).

Notes

References
 League Football: The South Melbourne Team, The Weekly Times, (Saturday, 13 June 1908), p.25.

External links 

1889 births
1964 deaths
Australian rules footballers from Melbourne
Sydney Swans players
People from Carlton, Victoria